Eryx miliaris, known as the dwarf sand boa, desert sand boa, or Tartar sand boa, is a species of snake in the Boidae family. The species is endemic to Asia.

Description
The body is strong and round. The tail is very short and thick. The head is almost mixed with the body. The front part of the body is soft, while the back part is rough and raised. Like the Indian sand boa, this snake also rounds its body when threatened. It does not try to bite humans. The snake is a mixture of brown, red and black, which turns white on both sides. Its diet includes small birds, desert lizards and other small animals. The Tartar Sand Boa is one the larger members of the genus Eryx. Adult females can reach 4 feet in length. Like most other Sand Boas, adult males are considerably shorter, rarely reaching 30 inches (75 cm). According to some scientists The Tartar Sand Boa is viviparous, which means that the female gives birth to live young. The female has about 7-10 young. and some scientists believe that this species lay eggs like other oviparous snakes.

Distribution
E. miliaris is found in Iran, Pakistan, Afghanistan, Turkmenistan, Uzbekistan, southern Russia, and northwestern China.

References

Further reading
 Eichwald [K]E. 1831. Zoologia specialis quam expositis animalibus tum vivis, tum fossilibus potissimum rossiae in universum, et poloniae in specie, in usum lectionum publicarum in Universitate Caesarea Vilnensi habendarum. Pars posterior. Vilnius: J. Zawadzki. pp. 116–197. (Eryx miliaris, p. 176). (in Latin).
 Pallas PS. 1773. Reise durch verschiedene Provinzen des Russischen Reichs. Zwenter Theil [Volume 2]. St. Petersburg, Russia: Russian Academy of Sciences. 744 pp. (Anguis miliaris, new species, p. 718). (in German and Latin).

miliaris
Reptiles described in 1773
Reptiles of Afghanistan
Reptiles of China
Reptiles of Iran
Reptiles of Russia
Reptiles of Central Asia
Taxa named by Peter Simon Pallas